NGC 7002 is a large elliptical galaxy around 320 million light-years away from Earth in the constellation of Indus. The galaxy was discovered by English astronomer John Herschel on September 30, 1834. NGC 7002 is also part of a group of galaxies that contains the nearby galaxy NGC 7004.

See also 
 IC 1101, A massive elliptical galaxy which is also one of the largest known galaxies.
 M87, A large and famous large elliptical galaxy about 50 mly in the constellation Virgo.
 List of NGC objects (7001–7840)

References

External links 

Astronomical objects discovered in 1834
Elliptical galaxies
Indus (constellation)
7002
66009